ERE Informatique was one of the first French video game companies, founded in 1983 by , joined a year later by Philippe Ulrich. The company hired freelance game programmers that received royalties for their creations.

History
Initially, the company published titles for the Amstrad CPC, Spectrum and Oric home computers. Rampon also acquired some shares of the company owned by Viau and established the company's first distribution network.

Their first international hit, topping many international sales list for several months, was Macadam Bumper (1985), a pinball simulation programmed by Rémi Herbulot, a self-taught ex-employee of Valeo living in Caen. This and several later titles were distributed (and labelled) by PSS in the United Kingdom, thanks to a mutual distribution agreement.

ERE underwent serious financial problems due to some distributors delaying payments (and some ultimately entering bankruptcy), and was looking to partner with a company able to ensure a secure distribution. FIL and Infogrames went into competitive bidding and eventually Infogrames entered Ere's share capital by buying out Rampon's shares by the end of 1986. Infogrames later acquired complete control of ERE in June, 1987.

Its Exxos label, announced in 1988 would produce their most famous and creative games. Due to financial problems, chiefly royalty inpayment, ERE's members left Infogrames in 1989 to form an independent developer group named Cryo, that would be made into an official company in 1992 as Cryo Interactive Entertainment.

Exxos

The development label Exxos was announced to the press in a ceremony at Champs Elysées ERE Studio 102 on June 12, 1988. Philippe Ulrich delivered the following litany to the press (translated from French):

The new label would release games with two requisites: original stories and worlds drawn from science fiction — a running interest among many members of ERE — or fantasy and translated to various languages, to achieve wide international distribution.

Games released

ERE label
 Mission Delta (1984) (also known as Intercepteur Cobalt)
 Macadam Bumper (1985) (also known as Pinball Wizard) 
 Painting Joe
 Contamination (1985).
 Pacific (1986)
 1001 BC (1986)
 Sram I (1986)
 Sram II (1986)
 Get Dexter (1986) (also known as its French title Crafton & Xunk)
 Phalsberg (1987)
 Eden Blues (1987)
 Bubble Ghost (1987)
 Despotik Design (1987)
 Oxphar (1987)
 Crash Garrett (1987) 
 Qin (1987)
 Get Dexter 2 (1988) (also known as its French title L'Ange de Cristal)
 RoBBBoT (1988)
 Apocalypse (1988)
 Teenage Queen (1988)

ERE label utils
 VOX (1984) speech, Sound Manipulation 
 ZX Spectrum Compilateur (1985) (re-release by PSSS with name McoderIII)

Exxos label
 Captain Blood (1988) (also known as L'Arche du capitaine Blood; first copies still under the ERE label)
 Purple Saturn Day (1988)
 KULT: The Temple of Flying Saucers (1989)

References

External links
Personal page about ERE
Page about Mission Delta
 WOS softography list

Defunct video game companies of France
Video game companies established in 1983